Demarcus Ayers (born July 7, 1994) is a former American football and Canadian football wide receiver. He played college football at Houston, and was drafted by the Pittsburgh Steelers in the seventh round of the 2016 NFL Draft.

College career
Ayers was Houston's starting kick returner in his freshman season and was named to the 2013 AAC First-team as a kick returner. He had 37 returns for 1,021 yards, breaking a Houston freshman record.

In 2014, in his sophomore season, he had 33 receptions for 335 yards and two touchdowns at receiver. He also made 34 returns for 592 yards at kick returner.

In 2015, in his junior season, Ayers led the American Athletic Conference in receptions with 97 and ranked sixth in the nation in receptions. He totaled 1,221 receiving yards, 18th in the nation. He was named to The American first-team at both wide receiver and kick returner.

College statistics

Professional career
Coming out of college, Ayers was projected by many analysts to not be selected in the 2016 NFL Draft. He was ranked the 53rd best wide receiver out of the 414 available by NFLDraftScout.com. He was invited to the NFL Combine and did the majority of the workout and positional drills. He was unable to do the 20-yard shuttle, 3-cone drill, and the bench press because of an injury to his hand and finger. He participated at Houston's Pro Day and chose to try to improve on his combine numbers and did all of the drills and workouts besides the bench and improved on everything except the broad jump.

Pittsburgh Steelers
Ayers was drafted by the Pittsburgh Steelers in the seventh round, 229th overall, in the 2016 NFL Draft. The 7th round pick used to select Ayers was traded from the New York Giants to the Steelers in exchange for punter Brad Wing. On May 5, 2016, Ayers signed a four-year contract with the Steelers. On September 3, 2016, he was released by the Steelers as part of final roster cuts and was signed to the practice squad the next day. On December 12, 2016, he was promoted to the active roster. Ayers made his professional debut on December 25, 2016, and caught his first career reception on a nine-yard pass from Ben Roethlisberger, helping the Steelers defeat the Baltimore Ravens 31–27. The following week, he earned his first career start in a 27–24 overtime win over the Cleveland Browns and caught a season-high five passes for 44 receiving yards and caught his first career touchdown on an 11-yard pass from Landry Jones.

On September 2, 2017, Ayers was waived by the Steelers after only one season.

New England Patriots
On September 4, 2017, Ayers was signed to the New England Patriots' practice squad. He was released on September 23, 2017.

Chicago Bears
On November 23, 2017, Ayers was signed to the Chicago Bears' practice squad. He signed a reserve/future contract with the Bears on January 1, 2018. He was waived by the team on September 1, 2018.

San Antonio Commanders
On November 9, 2018, Ayers signed with the San Antonio Commanders of the Alliance of American Football (AAF) for the 2019 season. The league ceased operations in April 2019.

New York Guardians
Ayers was drafted in the 5th round of the 2020 XFL Draft to the New York Guardians. He was waived before the start of the regular season on January 28, 2020.

Saskatchewan Roughriders
Ayers signed with the Saskatchewan Roughriders of the Canadian Football League on February 19, 2020. After the CFL canceled the 2020 season due to the COVID-19 pandemic, Ayers chose to opt-out of his contract with the Roughriders on August 25, 2020. He opted back in to his contract on January 20, 2021. He was released on July 3, 2021.

References

External links
 University of Houston bio 

1994 births
Living people
American football wide receivers
Chicago Bears players
Houston Cougars football players
New England Patriots players
New York Guardians players
People from Lancaster, Texas
Pittsburgh Steelers players
Players of American football from Texas
San Antonio Commanders players
Saskatchewan Roughriders players
Sportspeople from the Dallas–Fort Worth metroplex